Deroplatys indica is a species of praying mantis in the family Deroplatyidae. This species was first described in 2007 after a single male from India, preserved in the Muséum d'Histoire naturelle de la ville de Genève (MHNG), was further researched.

See also
 
 List of mantis genera and species

References

indica
Mantodea of Asia
Insects of India
Insects described in 2007